Glendale Academy is a high school located in Golkonda, Hyderabad, India. The school was founded by Anjum Babukhan to be a blend of both the Indian and Western educational systems.

Organisation
The school is affiliated with the Central Board of Secondary Education, India. It is an International school.

References

External links
 

Schools in Hyderabad, India
High schools and secondary schools in Andhra Pradesh
Educational institutions in India with year of establishment missing